Evgeny Aleksandrovich Kobernyak (born 24 January 1995) is a Russian former professional cyclist, who rode professionally for the  team in 2018 and 2019.

Major results
2017
 3rd Overall Five Rings of Moscow

References

External links

1995 births
Living people
Russian male cyclists
Cyclists from Saint Petersburg